Shinobi is a Japanese synonym for ninja. A female shinobi may also be referred to as a kunoichi. It may also refer to:

Shinobi (series), a series of video games
 Shinobi (1987 video game), the original arcade video game in the series developed by Sega
 Shinobi (2002 video game), the PlayStation 2 sequel
 Shinobi (2011 video game), the 2011 Nintendo 3DS game
 Shinobi: Heart Under Blade, a 2005 Japanese film
"Shinobi", a song by Eyehategod from the album In the Name of Suffering
Shinobi Shaw, a Marvel Comics villain
 Ring name of professional wrestler Al Snow (born 1963)

See also
 
 Ninja (disambiguation)
 Ninja Warrior (disambiguation)
 Kunoichi (disambiguation)